Cathy Susan "Cate" Zeuske (born December 4, 1958), is an American Republican politician who served as the 31st State Treasurer of Wisconsin and 9th Secretary of the Wisconsin Department of Revenue.  She was also elected to four terms in the Wisconsin State Assembly and was Deputy Secretary of the Wisconsin Department of Administration.

Early life and career 
A native of Clintonville, Wisconsin, Zeuske graduated from Shawano High School and then attended McGill University. She received her B.A. from the University of Wisconsin–Madison. Prior to her political career, she worked as an insurance agent.

Public office 
Zeuske was elected to the Wisconsin State Assembly in 1982 at the age of 23, and served until 1991, having decided to forgo re-election and instead run against incumbent State Treasurer Charles Smith (D) in 1990.

State Treasurer (1991-1995) 
On November 6, 1990, Zeuske was elected Wisconsin State Treasurer. During her time in office she established the State Treasurer's Advisory Council and State Treasurer's Annual Conference for Local and County Clerks/Treasurers. She was also a member of the State Board of Commissioners of Public Lands, State Board of Canvassers, State Depository Selection Board, Insurance Security Fund, State of Wisconsin Investment Board, Wisconsin Retirement Fund, National Association of State Treasurers, Heritage Tourism Advisory Council, Wisconsin Trust for Historic Preservation, Governor's Commission on Dental Care, and Council on State-Local Relations.

She gave up her reelection bid in 1994 to compete in the Republican Senate primary for the opportunity to run against incumbent Democratic Senator Herb Kohl. In the September primary, she lost the nomination to State Senator Robert Welch. On November 8, 1994, Republican Jack Voight was elected as the new State Treasurer, while Senator Kohl went on to defeat State Senator Welch 58% to 41%. In 2000, Zeuske served as a member of the platform committee for the Republican National Convention. She was a member of the Wisconsin Women for Trump coalition in 2016.

Cabinet Positions 
Zeuske was then appointed in 1995 as Deputy for the Wisconsin Housing and Economic Development Authority and later as Secretary of the Wisconsin Department of Revenue from 1999 to 2001. From 2001 to 2015, Zeuske was the administrative director of a non-profit organization and international leadership academy for public officials.

In 2015, Zeuske was appointed by Governor of Wisconsin Scott Walker to serve as Deputy Secretary of the Wisconsin Department of Administration. She resigned in May 2018.

Personal life 
Zeuske is married to John Gard, who served as Speaker of the Wisconsin State Assembly from 2003 until 2007. They have two children.

Electoral history

Wisconsin Treasurer (1990)

| colspan="6" style="text-align:center;background-color: #e9e9e9;"| General Election, November 6, 1990

United States Senate (1994)

| colspan="6" style="text-align:center;background-color: #e9e9e9;"| Republican Primary, September 13, 1994

References

1958 births
State treasurers of Wisconsin
McGill University alumni
University of Wisconsin–Madison alumni
Republican Party members of the Wisconsin State Assembly
Living people
People from Clintonville, Wisconsin
Women state legislators in Wisconsin
20th-century American women politicians
20th-century American politicians
Candidates in the 1994 United States elections
21st-century American women